Organ Trail is a "retro zombie survival game" that parodies the educational game series The Oregon Trail. It was initially released as a free Adobe Flash-based browser game, and later as a Facebook app. This version was developed by Ben Perez, Michael Block, and Ryan Wiemeyer. The game uses the Unity game engine.

An expanded version, The Organ Trail: Director's Cut, was released on mobile devices in August 2012. That same month the Director's Cut was also posted on Steam Greenlight; after receiving enough support, it was released on Steam for Windows, Mac, and Linux on March 19, 2013. The expanded version was developed by Michael Block and Ryan Wiemeyer, founders of the company The Men Who Wear Many Hats.

Director's Cut has sold 429,192 copies as of August 9, 2013. Most of the copies were sold on Humble Bundle, Steam and iOS. Most profits were made on the Steam and iOS platforms.

Gameplay

In The Organ Trail, players must cross a post-apocalyptic United States in a car in order to reach a sanctuary free of zombies, called Safe Haven. Players must manage their limited resources, including food, ammunition, medicine, scrap, money, and fuel for their vehicle, in order to complete their journey and keep everyone in their party alive and healthy.

At the beginning players can choose from a number of characters to play as, including a cop from Kentucky, a clerk from New Jersey, or a lawyer from Miami. Each character has different bonuses in gameplay. For example, the cop will offer more hours for the player to scavenge for supplies at the beginning of the game but will earn fewer points if the player beats the game, while the lawyer will give the player the least amount of time to scavenge for supplies but will earn the most points.

In Complete Edition, the player can unlock different character skins, including Ash from Evil Dead, Ripley from the Alien franchise, George A. Romero and Mad Max. There are more references to other games and films, such as Left 4 Dead, the Resident Evil franchise, E.T., Night of the Living Dead, Zombieland, Planet Terror, and more. Characters can be named and can contain Easter eggs. For example, naming a character "Chuck Norris", might trigger random events such as "Chuck Norris did a spinning kick in the car and broke his leg" and "Chuck Norris headbutts a piece of wood for some reason". Naming 2 or more characters "Chuck Norris" might trigger an event when Chuck Norris sees a nuke dropping and drags it into space (however, the character will be gone).

Every hour (10–5 seconds in game) a special event might happen, such as getting surrounded by zombies, characters experiencing different events in the car (negative and positive), seeing tombstones in the distance (the player will be given the choice of investigating it or not. Investigating it triggers the event of finding supplies near the grave or a zombie emerging from the grave), negative events to the car (for example, accidentally popping the tire or the muffler breaking) and many more. Certain events can cause death to another character (such as when a bandit grabs a character). The player might be chased by a bike gang (this mostly occurs when leaving a settlement), a bandit gang (random chance of occurrence while on the road) and fighting a bandit king (this occurs mainly towards the end of the game and to trigger this, a character must be lost. Killing the bandit king will reward the player with a new vehicle). Characters might get sicknesses like cholera, typhoid, measles, and more.

Different vehicles exist. The first, a station wagon, is unlocked by default, the second, a SUV which bears strikingly resemblance to Zombieland, is unlocked when getting to Safe Haven, the third, a sedan which bears strikingly resemblance to the green Jaguar in Shaun of the Dead, is unlocked when completing the game on Suicide difficulty, the fourth, a muscle car, is unlocked when the player unlocks all the skulls in Endless mode and the fifth, a UFO, is unlocked when beating the aliens at Area 51. Each vehicle differs from another in means of reliability, speed, and durability. Eventually, on the road, if the player does not get to a town in time, the car might break down and requires scrap to repair. The player can trade with traders for supplies.

The game uses real-life cities as landmarks between Safe Haven and the starting point. Some examples include Indianapolis, Chicago, Los Angeles, Washington, D.C., Area 51, Dallas, and more. Some landmarks are simply marked as "Castle", "Gas Station", "Farmland", "Dump Site", "Satellite Field", and more. Player are given the ability to see what car upgrades/skills and light or decent supplies are available at the next landmark, giving the player a choice where to go next. On the map, radiation zones are marked with green. These areas should generally be avoided, because they will give the player and the group radiation sickness (exceptions include getting the UFO at Area 51 and more advantages in terms of upgraded).

While reaching a landmark, the player arrives in a town. In the town, the player can buy supplies and, depending on the location, they can either buy car parts, repair and upgrade the car or can get skills. The player can also talk to strangers, giving them tips, sell supplies for money, scavenge supplies, rest and heal themselves and party members. For supplies, the player can take jobs in towns, such as recovering an item from a cemetery and roads, killing bandits, and defending the town from a horde. The player is paid with supplies such as tires, mufflers, money, medkits, fuel, and ammo.

The zombies get more active at night, therefore increasing danger. There are 4 stages of zombie activity: Low, Medium, High and Deadly. These can influence the number of zombies in scavenging and scenarios.

Special zombies exist. There is a shambling, melting zombie which leaves radioactive sludge behind and appear only in radiated zones. A tall zombie which sprints for the player but is stunned when the player looks at him, is encountered randomly on scavenging missions. Another special is a fat zombie which takes 2 shots to kill, as opposed to normal zombies taking only one, is commonly encountered. A half-zombie which crawls at high speed is rarer than the fat ones but still pretty common; they're most commonly encountered at tombstones and take only one shot to kill. The normal zombies are most common, walk slowly and take one shot to die.

In missions and while scavenging, players are able to select one from three weapons before starting. The first is a single shot rifle with quick reload, the second is a three shot shotgun but has a slower reload and the last is a four-quick-shots pistol with same reload speed as the shotgun. The only scenario where the player is not able to select one of the three is when a zombie crawls out of a tombstone; they will automatically be given the rifle.

In Endless mode, players do not have a specific target to reach. Instead they have 2 landmark options from which they are able to select. As usual, the player are able to select their skin, car and name the characters before starting. However, instead of choosing how much hours to spend on scavenging before finishing the tutorial as in the campaign, players can choose "sets" of supplies, skills, and car upgrades. There are 2 sets of modifiers, one column increasing the player's point, albeit having a negative effect and the other column decreasing the player's points albeit having a positive effect.

In both campaign and endless, while scavenging, the player may encounter bosses. The first boss is a bear which doesn't die but bullets temporarily slow him down and can be encountered randomly while scavenging. The second boss are aliens in UFOs and can be encountered in Area 51 while scavenging. Upon beating the bosses, the player will unlock the UFO vehicle. The third boss is a biker gang which will typically occur when the player leaves a settlement. At least 10 bikers will spawn and try to shoot at the car and they can be killed by crashing into them; the car does not take damage from the crashes. The fourth boss are a horde of zombie deer and will occur randomly while on the road. The player must avoid them to not take damage. The fifth boss are bandits which have a small chance of occurrence and occurs randomly while on the road. The player must survive 30 seconds avoiding obstacles to not be slowed down to be captured by the bandits. The sixth boss are the Bandit Boss, which is very rare to occur. This plays like a normal scavenging mission, but must kill the Bandit Boss and  a few of his henchmen. This occurs towards the end of the game but the player must lose a character. When defeating the Bandit Boss, he is revealed to be the lost character and the player is given the choice to shoot him or not. Regardless of the choice, the player will unlock the Interceptor from Mad Max.

The endings are different depending on the difficulty. On Easy and Normal, upon reaching Save Haven, they must collect 6 fuel cans to power to generator to open the bridge, therefore granting access to Safe Haven. On Difficult and Suicide, the player must collect the cans, 8 this time, but upon powering the generator, a giant squid-like creature will appear out of Safe Haven. This boss battle has two phases: the first is the player driving while avoiding the squid's tentacles. The second is to shoot the squid while also shooting its tentacles.

Director's Cut
The Organ Trails popularity led its developers to start a Kickstarter to fund a "director's cut" of the game based on fan feedback and suggestions. The Director's Cut features a number of changes to the original game, including a customizable protagonist instead of the above preset characters, "choose-your-own-adventure" style random encounters, boss fights, in-game achievements and online leaderboards. While the original game has been described as a "1:1 pure parody" of The Oregon Trail, the developers decided The Director's Cut should stand on its own as a title that pushed beyond the source material.

In contrast to the original game which is free to play, The Director's Cut is a commercial product. It was released for iOS and Android devices on August 9, 2012. It debuted for Linux, Mac, PC and Android via The Humble Bundle.

Reception

The game received "generally favorable reviews" on all platforms except the PC version, which received "average" reviews, according to the review aggregation website Metacritic.

References

External links
 
 
 
 
 

2010 video games
Android (operating system) games
Browser games
Facebook games
Flash games
Freeware games
IOS games
Kickstarter-funded video games
Linux games
MacOS games
Ouya games
Parody video games
PlayStation 4 games
PlayStation Vita games
Retro-style video games
Indie video games
Survival video games
Video games developed in the United States
Video games set in the United States
Windows games
Video games about zombies